Bickford Shmeckler's Cool Ideas is a 2006 American comedy film written and directed by Scott Lew, starring Patrick Fugit and Olivia Wilde.

Plot
The film starts out with the quote "Nothing can ever be truly, fully understood. Not even the most simple idea. Not even this."

Bickford Shmeckler is a lonely college student who keeps a journal known as "The Book" of his philosophical ideas and theories. One night during a loud toga party, his book is stolen by the inebriated and beautiful Sarah Witt, who briefly meets Bickford and is shown to be a kleptomaniac. Sarah becomes enamored with the writings, and experiences what she calls "braingasms". After showing The Book to her boyfriend Trent, she rants about how she would love to meet the author (and have sex with him). Later that night, Bickford discovers that the book is missing and begins to panic.

By interrogating his roommates, Bickford quickly finds and meets Sarah while she is working at the school's art studio. She kisses him, and explains that his work inspired her to paint. They go to Trent's dorm and discover that he threw the book out over his jealously that Sarah was so taken with Bickford's work. By this time, a delusional homeless man nicknamed "Space Man" has found the book, and becomes convinced that Bickford can free the "extra-dimensionals" living in his head. Space Man extorts Bickford, but after making no progress, a despondent Schmeckler gives up. Meanwhile, the owners of a comic book store read the book and fall in love with it, reprinting it, distributing free copies of it, and going as far as selling related merchandise. Sarah discovers this, and still feeling guilty, tells Bickford. They learn of the free distribution of his book, and Bickford confronts the comic store owners. Frustrated that their newfound idol does not care about The Book's newfound popularity, they angrily give it back.

Despite having it once more, however, Bickford still fails to find himself at ease. One of his college professors, who has read the Book, sets Bickford up with a publisher without his consent, and it is heavily implied she demands he sleep with her as a favor. Under increasing pressure, Bickford confides in Sarah that he began writing the book after his mother died in a car accident while he was at the wheel; his father had checked him into a mental institution to treat his resulting mental breakdowns, and he began to record his thoughts in a notebook the doctors provided.

An insult from Sarah prompts Bickford to realize that nothing in life can ever be truly understood, and he includes a disclaimer in The Book warning readers to take the time to have fun in life's fleeting chaos. Bickford returns the book to the comic store owners and grants them permission to reprint and give it away, under the conditions that it be free and no merchandise be created. He then begins a romantic relationship with Sarah, experiences sex for the first time, and is inspired to write a new poem.

Cast
Patrick Fugit as Bickford Shmeckler
Olivia Wilde as Sarah Witt
Fran Kranz as Ralph, Bickford's roommate
John Cho as Bob
Reid Scott as Trent
Matthew Lillard as Spaceman
Cheryl Hines as Professor Adams
Simon Helberg as Al
Chris Weitz as Sheldon Schmeckler (voice)
Thomas Lennon as Campus Cop
Robert Ben Garant as Campus Cop (as Ben Garant)

External links
 
 

2006 films
2006 comedy films
American comedy films
Films about books
Films scored by John Swihart
Films set in universities and colleges
2000s English-language films
2000s American films